Horyonggoksan  is a mountain in Incheon, South Korea. The mountain is on the southern end of Muuido, in the district of Jung-gu.

See also
 List of mountains in Korea

Notes

References
 

Mountains of South Korea